This is a list of Japanese hip hop musicians and artists.

Rappers and crews 
(in alphabetical order)

213 HIGH ROLLAZ
 Afra
 Ai
 Awich
 Bennie K
 chelmico
 CREAM
 Dohzi-T
 Dragon Ash
 East End X Yuri
 Halcali
 Heartsdales
 Hi-Timez
 Hifana
 Hilcrhyme
 Hime
 Home Made Kazoku
 Ilmari
 K Dub Shine
 Ken the 390
 Ketsumeishi
 Kick the Can Crew
 King Gidora
 Kohei Japan
 KOHH
 Kreva
 M-Flo
 Matsushita Yuya
 Mellow Yellow
 Mihimaru GT
 Miliyah Kato
 Miss Monday
 nobodyknows+
 Rhymester
 Rip Slyme
 Scha Dara Parr
 Seamo
 Shakkazombie
  SUGA SHACK
 Shing02
 Sky-Hi
 Soulhead
 Soul'd Out
 Sphere of Influence
 Steady & Co.
 Teriyaki Boyz
 Tha Blue Herb
 Uzi
 Verbal
 Wise
 Ya-kyim
 Yurika
 Zeebra

DJs and producers 

 Cradle
 Dabo
 Hiroshi Fujiwara
 DJ Honda
 DJ Kentaro
 DJ Krush
 Mihara
 DJ Muro
 DJ Okawari
 Nigo
 Nujabes
 Silent Poets
 Uyama Hiroto

See also 
 Japanese hip hop
 Music of Japan

References 

 
Hip hop musicians
Japanese hip hop musicians